Behind The Scenes are a gothic rock band from Germany.

See also
The Sisters of Mercy
The Mission UK

External links
Official site with band information, history, releases, gigs, etc
Behind the Scenes on MySpace

German musical groups
Musical groups established in 1993
1993 establishments in Germany